Riska is a borough of the city of Sandnes in Rogaland county, Norway.  The borough sits in the northern part of the municipality, northeast of the city centre of Sandnes.  The Gandsfjorden flows along the west side of the borough and the Høgsfjorden runs along the northeast side.  The  borough has a population (2016) of 7,294.

The main village of Riska is Hommersåk where the Riska Church and Old Riska Church are located.  The local sports team is Riska IL.  The island of Uskjo is part of the borough.

References

Boroughs and neighbourhoods of Sandnes